is Japanese voice actress and singer Maaya Uchida's 11th single, released on November 25, 2020.

Track listings

Charts

Event 
 『 Maaya Party！11』　Maaya Uchida 11th Single Release Event「Maaya Party！11」（December 19, 2020 - December 26, 2020：Online）

Album

References

2020 singles
2020 songs
J-pop songs
Japanese-language songs
Pony Canyon singles